Acrocercops vallata is a moth of the family Gracillariidae. It is known from Japan (Honshū, Kyūshū, Shikoku).

The wingspan is 7.5–8 mm.

The larvae feed on Quercus acuta, Quercus glauca and Quercus salicina. They mine the leaves of their host plant.

References

vallata
Moths described in 1988
Moths of Japan